Piedra, officially CPA Rubén Martínez Villena is a CPA in the ward of La Quinta, Cuba.

Geography
Piedra lies in a natural forest area.

History
Until 1976 Piedra was a barrio of San Antonio de las Vueltas.

Economy
According at the DMPF of Camajuani, Piedra is a settlement linked to sources of employment or economic development.

References

Populated places in Villa Clara Province